Bloomfield High School is part of Bloomfield-Mespo Schools. The school is located in North Bloomfield, Ohio, Trumbull County, Ohio This school accommodates to Bloomfield Township and Mesopotamia Township. Their mascots are the Cardinals and compete as a member of the Ohio High School Athletic Association and is a member of the Northeastern Athletic Conference.

Athletics 
Bloomfield High School currently offers:

 Basketball (boys only 2023)
 Bowling (girls only)
 Cross Country
 Cheerleading
 Softball
 Track and Field (boys only 2022)
 Volleyball

Departments
There are several departments, including math, music, English, art, science, social studies, home economics, Spanish/communications, physical education, business/computers, guidance counselor and special education.

External links

Notes

High schools in Trumbull County, Ohio
Public high schools in Ohio
Public middle schools in Ohio